San Giorgio del Sannio (formerly San Giorgo alla Montagna or San Giorgio la Montagna) is a comune (municipality) in the Province of Benevento in the Italian region Campania, located about 60 km northeast of Naples and about 9 km southeast of Benevento. As of 31 December 2004, it had a population of 9,785 and an area of 22.3 km2.

San Giorgio del Sannio borders the following municipalities: Apice, Calvi, Paduli, San Martino Sannita, San Nazzaro, San Nicola Manfredi.

Demographic evolution

References

Cities and towns in Campania